İbrahimoğlu or Ibrahimoghlu is a Turkish and Azerbaijani surname. Its literal meaning of "descendant of Ibrahim" is similar to that of the Bosnian surname Ibrahimović and the Albanian family name Brahimaj and it strongly indicates Muslim religious affiliation of its bearer. People with the name include:
 Adem İbrahimoğlu (born 1957), former Turkish football player
 İlqar İbrahimoğlu (born 1973), Azerbaijani religious leader
 İsmet İbrahimoğlu (born 1943), Turkish chess player
 Melih İbrahimoğlu (born 2000), footballer
 Rafet İbrahimoğlu (1931–2012), Turkish politician
 Vaqif İbrahimoğlu (1949–2011), Azerbaijani actor and theater director

References

Turkish-language surnames
Azerbaijani-language surnames
Patronymic surnames
Surnames from given names